Gu Chao (Chinese: 顾超; Pinyin: Gù Chāo; born 20 August 1989) is a Chinese footballer who currently plays for Zhejiang Pro in the Chinese Super League.

Club career
Gu Chao joined the Genbao Football Academy in 2000 and was promoted to Shanghai East Asia's first team squad during the 2006 season. He played regularly as the starting goalkeeper and made an impression within the team as Shanghai won promotion to the second tier in the 2007 season.

On 15 March 2011, Gu transferred to Chinese Super League side Hangzhou Greentown for a fee of ¥2 million. On 6 July 2011, he made his debut for Hangzhou in a 1–1 away draw against Dalian Shide. He mainly played as the backup goalkeeper for Jiang Bo in the 2011 season and 2012 season. However, it was not until the 2014 season when Gu cemented his role as the team's starting goalkeeper.

On 31 December 2015, Gu moved to Chinese Super League side Jiangsu Suning on a five-year contract with a transfer fee of ¥50 million, which being above Wang Dalei's transfer record fee of ¥30 million, made him the most expensive goalkeeper in China. He played as a back-up for Zhang Sipeng at the beginning of the season. Gu made his debut for Jiangsu on 9 April 2016 in a 1–0 win against Henan Jianye. He became the first choice goalkeeper of the club after the match. At the end of the 2020 Chinese Super League he would repay the club by winning the league title with them. On 28 February 2021, the parent company of the club Suning Holdings Group announced that operations were going to cease immediately due to financial difficulties.

On 15 March 2021, Gu returned to Hangzhou by joining second tier club Zhejiang Pro on a free transfer. In his first season back he quickly established himself as a vital member of the team as the club gained promotion to the top tier at the end of the 2021 campaign.

International career
Gu was called up to the senior China squad for the 2018 FIFA World Cup qualification – AFC Third Round against South Korea and Iran. Gu made his debut for the China on 6 September 2016 in a 0-0 draw against Iran, coming on as a substitute for injury Zeng Cheng in the 12th minute.

Career statistics 
Statistics accurate as of match played 31 January 2023.

Honours

Club
Shanghai East Asia
 China League Two: 2007

Jiangsu Suning
Chinese Super League: 2020

References

External links
 
 

1989 births
Living people
Chinese footballers
Footballers from Shanghai
Shanghai Port F.C. players
Zhejiang Professional F.C. players
Jiangsu F.C. players
Association football goalkeepers
Chinese Super League players
China League One players
China League Two players
China international footballers